Mark Nathan Billinghurst is a computer interface technology researcher. His work focuses on augmented reality (AR) technology. Billinghurst was made a Fellow of the IEEE in 2023.

Education 
Billinghurst completed his school education at the New Plymouth Boys' High School. He received Bachelor of Computing and Mathematical Science (first class honors) and Master of Philosophy (Applied Mathematics & Physics) degrees in 1990 and 1992 respectively. Both degrees are from Waikato University. He received his PhD in Electrical Engineering from the University of Washington's Human Interface Technology Laboratory in 2002. His dissertation was Shared Space: Explorations in Collaborative Augmented Reality. Billinghurst's doctoral advisors were Linda Shapiro and Thomas A. Furness III. For his PhD course, Billinghurst created the Magic Book, a children's book animated through augmented reality produced by a head-mounted display. Billinghurst describes the Magic Book as technology "that allows you to overlay computer graphics onto the real world, in real time".

Career 
Billinghurst is professor of Human Computer Interaction at the University of South Australia (from 2015), professor at the University of Auckland's Bioengineering Institute (from 2018) and director of the Empathic Computing Laboratory. He is the founder and formerly the director of the University of Canterbury's HIT Lab NZ for 13 years; he is now an associate professor at the University of Canterbury. In 2001, Billinghurst co-founded ARToolworks and helped to create ARToolKit, an open source AR development platform. He is a founder of the SuperVentures AR/VR fund. Billinghurst is part of the New Zealand Government’s Growth and Innovation Advisory Board, being appointed in 2005. Billinghurst's previous work includes jobs with ATR Research Labs in Japan, British Telecom's Advanced Perception Unit, an internship with Hit Lab US, Nokia, Google, Amazon and the MIT Media Laboratory. During his career, Billinghurst has published over 650 research papers; he is one of the most cited AR researchers.

Personal life 
Billinghurst was born in New Plymouth, New Zealand. He is a member of the Riccarton Ward of The Church of Jesus Christ of Latter-day Saints.

Awards and honors 

 2001 Discover Magazine Entertainment Award for the Magic Book technology.
 Selected for the 2002 New Zealand Innovation Pavilion.
 Nominated for the 2004 World Technology Network Education Award.
 2006 World Class New Zealand Award.
 Winner of the 2006 International Mobile Gaming Awards Grand Prix for the AR Tennis mobile game.
 2007 Adweek Buzz Awards for Best Print Campaign.
 2012 IEEE ISMAR Lasting Impact Award.
 2013 IEEE VR Technical Achievement Award "for contributions to research and commercialization in Augmented Reality".
 Elevated to Fellow of the Royal Society of New Zealand in 2013.
 2018 University of South Australia ITEE Research Excellence award.
 2019 IEEE ISMAR Career Impact Award.
 Elevated to Fellow of the IEEE in 2023 "for contributions to augmented and virtual reality".

References 

Fellow Members of the IEEE
New Zealand academics
Academic staff of the University of South Australia
Academic staff of the University of Canterbury
Academic staff of the University of Auckland
Year of birth missing (living people)
Living people
People from New Plymouth
People educated at New Plymouth Boys' High School
University of Waikato alumni
University of Washington alumni